Daniel Boone Hays House, also known as Hays Farm, is a historic home near Defiance, St. Charles County, Missouri. It was built between about 1826 and 1836, and is a two-story, "L"-plan, stone dwelling. The house measures approximately 42 feet wide and 52 feet deep. It was built by Daniel Boone Hays (1789-1866), an early settler and grandson of the famous pioneer Daniel Boone.

It was added to the National Register of Historic Places in 1973.

References

Houses on the National Register of Historic Places in Missouri
Houses completed in 1836
Buildings and structures in St. Charles County, Missouri
National Register of Historic Places in St. Charles County, Missouri